Benjamin Harrison Taylor (July 1, 1888 – January 24, 1953) was an American first baseman and manager in baseball's Negro leagues. Taylor played for the Birmingham Giants, Chicago American Giants, Indianapolis ABC's, St. Louis Giants, Bacharach Giants, Washington Potomacs, Harrisburg Giants, and Baltimore Black Sox. He was elected to the Baseball Hall of Fame in 2006.

Early life
Taylor was born in Anderson, South Carolina. He was the youngest of four brothers who all became famous in baseball, including C.I., Candy Jim and Johnny "Steel Arm".

Negro league career
Taylor initiated his career as a pitcher for the Birmingham Giants in 1908. After playing for the St. Louis Giants (1911–12), New York Lincoln Giants (1912) and Rube Foster's Chicago American Giants (1913–14), Taylor made his name playing for the team one of his brothers, C.I. Taylor, managed and owned, the Indianapolis ABCs.

Following a 1915 season in which he hit .308, he set Cuba ablaze, hitting .500 in winter league play. He took that hot bat into the 1916 championship season. Ben went 11-for-18 in the World Series, stealing three bases in five games.

Other than a 1919 season split between Hilldale and a managerial stint with the Bacharach Giants, Ben played with the ABCs from 1914 to 1922. In that final season, he replaced C.I. as manager, following his death.

In 1923, Taylor organized the Washington Potomacs, bringing brother Johnny along as pitching coach. The team joined the new Eastern Colored League in its inaugural season the following year.

Defensively, he was good on ground balls and could execute all the plays at first, making the other infielders look good by digging out low throws and making difficult plays with such ease that they appeared routine.

Ben continued as a player/manager, joining Harrisburg in 1925 and the Baltimore Black Sox from 1926 to 1928. He was then traded to the Bacharach Giants in exchange for their manager Dick Lundy prior to the 1929 campaign, the final season of his playing career. In all but one of his first 16 seasons, Taylor batted over .300. During his career, he was also a manager and excellent teacher of young players. It was from him that Buck Leonard learned to polish and refine his skills as a first baseman. He continued to coach and manage until 1940.

Later life
After retiring, Taylor was an active businessman, operating a poolroom and acquiring the rights to print and sell game programs at Baltimore Elite Giants games. In a 1949 Philadelphia Evening Bulletin article, Oscar Charleston selected Ben Taylor as his first baseman on his all-time All-Star team. In 1952, as the Negro league's decline was in rapid motion, the Pittsburgh Courier polled its readers to name the greatest players of the Negro leagues. They eventually named 5 teams plus honorable mentions. Among those honored, Taylor was awarded 2nd team, first base.

He died at age 64 in Baltimore, Maryland.

References

 
(Riley.) Ben Taylor, Personal profiles at Negro Leagues Baseball Museum. – identical to Riley (confirmed 2010-04-16)

External links

 and Baseball-Reference Black Baseball stats and Seamheads
  and Seamheads

National Baseball Hall of Fame inductees
Bacharach Giants players
Baltimore Black Sox players
Birmingham Giants players
Chicago American Giants players
Harrisburg Giants players
Indianapolis ABCs players
Lincoln Giants players
St. Louis Giants players
Washington Potomacs players
West Baden Sprudels players
Negro league baseball managers
Baseball players from South Carolina
People from Anderson, South Carolina
1888 births
1953 deaths
20th-century African-American people